Lover's Luck is a 1914 American short comedy film directed by and starring Fatty Arbuckle.

Cast
 Roscoe 'Fatty' Arbuckle as Fatty
 Minta Durfee as The Girl
 Al St. John as Fatty's Rival
 Josef Swickard as The Girl's Father
 Phyllis Allen as The Girl's Mother
 Frank Hayes as Justice of the Peace
 Slim Summerville as A Villager
 Alice Howell as Leader of Snoopy Neighbors
 Luke the Dog as uncredited

See also
 List of American films of 1914
 Fatty Arbuckle filmography

External links

1914 films
Films directed by Roscoe Arbuckle
1914 comedy films
1914 short films
American silent short films
American black-and-white films
Silent American comedy films
American comedy short films
1910s American films